The territory of the United States state of Connecticut was first settled by Europeans in the 1620s, when Dutch traders established trading posts on the Connecticut River.  English settlers, mainly Puritans fleeing repression in England, began to arrive in the 1630s, and a number of separate colonies were established.  The first was the Saybrook Colony in 1635, based at the mouth of the Connecticut; it was followed by the Connecticut Colony (first settlement 1633, government from 1639) and the New Haven Colony (settled 1638, government from 1639).  The Saybrook Colony merged with the Connecticut Colony in 1644, and the New Haven Colony was merged into Connecticut between 1662 and 1665 after Connecticut received a royal charter.

The Connecticut Colony was one of two colonies (the other was the neighboring Colony of Rhode Island and Providence Plantations) that retained its governor during the American Revolution.  The last colonial governor, Jonathan Trumbull, became the state of Connecticut's first governor in 1776.

Saybrook Colony, 1635–1644

The Saybrook Colony was established in late 1635 at the mouth of the Connecticut River in present day Old Saybrook, Connecticut by John Winthrop the Younger, son of Massachusetts Bay Colony founder and governor John Winthrop.  The former was designated governor by the original settlers who included George Fenwick and Lion Gardiner. They claimed possession of the land via a deed of conveyance from Robert Rich, 2nd Earl of Warwick.  The colony was named in honor of Puritan Lords Saye (William Fiennes, 1st Viscount Saye and Sele) and Brooke (Robert Greville, 2nd Baron Brooke), who were prominent Parliamentarians and the colony's principal investors.

The colony was little more than a single community.  It came under the de facto governorship upon the arrival of Fenwick, who was the only signer of the deed to actually live in the colony.  In 1644 Fenwick conveyed the right of government to the flourishing Connecticut Colony, although issues surrounding this transfer led to litigation over property rights afterward.  Fenwick returned to England and served in the English Civil War, and Winthrop continued to be active in Connecticut politics.

New Haven Colony, 1639–1665

The New Haven Colony was established by the Puritan colonist Theophilus Eaton, who was of the opinion that the policies of the Massachusetts Bay Colony were too lax in enforcing Puritan standards.  After some exploration he purchased land from local Indians at the mouth of the Quinnipiac River in cx 1638.  The colony in 1639 established a government modeled on that drafted by the leaders of the Connecticut Colony, which called for annual elections of its governor.  Eaton was elected governor until his death in 1658.  Following the restoration of King Charles II to the English throne in 1660, the colony became a subject of his ire when it harbored two fugitive regicides of Charles I, Edward Whalley and William Goffe.  In 1662 Charles II issued a royal charter for the Connecticut Colony that merged the two colonies.  The process of merger was not completed until 1665.  The colony's last governor, William Leete, also later served as governor of Connecticut.

Connecticut Colony, 1639–1776

The Connecticut Colony was formed from the towns of Hartford, Windsor and Wethersfield. Between 1639 and 1655, consecutive terms were not allowed, so the governorship rotated between John Haynes and Edward Hopkins each year, except for 1642 when George Wyllys served. Thomas Welles and John Winthrop the Younger also served non-consecutive terms.

John Winthrop the Younger was the governor of the combined Connecticut Colony in 1662, the year it received its royal charter. However, the regime change did not include an election for governor; Winthrop was merely retained in his position. The merger took three years to complete, during which time William Leete remained in New Haven. A similar situation happened to Jonathan Trumbull in 1776; the royal government was discarded for state government without a gubernatorial election, making Trumbull the independent state's first governor.

Sir Edmund Andros attempted to merge Connecticut into the Dominion of New England in 1687.  As governor of the Province of New York in the 1670s, he had attempted to enforce the Duke of York's claims to territories as far east as the Connecticut River, and his assumption of Dominion control in October 1687 was marked by a failed attempt to seize the colonial charter.  Andros is pointedly excluded from numbered lists of Connecticut governors; however, his portrait hangs, along with those of other governors, in Memorial Hall in the Connecticut State Supreme Court/State Library/State Museum building across from the State Capitol in Hartford.  As Andros failed to take the Connecticut Charter, Connecticut was never absorbed into the Dominion of New England.

References  

Connecticut
 
Colonial Governors